The Bagoé River is a tributary of the Bani River in western Africa. It flows through northern Côte d'Ivoire and southern Mali and forms part of the border between the two states. A major tributary is the Banifin River.

References

Rivers of Ivory Coast
Rivers of Mali
International rivers of Africa
Tributaries of the Niger River
Ivory Coast–Mali border